Tsuenokochi No.1 Tameike Dam is an earthfill dam located in Yamaguchi prefecture in Japan. The dam is used for irrigation. The catchment area of the dam is 0.6 km2. The dam impounds about 2  ha of land when full and can store 126 thousand cubic meters of water.

References

Dams in Yamaguchi Prefecture
1907 establishments in Japan